Sentul is a suburb located within the northern part of the city centre in Kuala Lumpur, Malaysia, in the constituency of Batu. The vicinity of Sentul is sandwiched between Segambut and Titiwangsa.

History
Sentul is a former railway hub famous for its old-world charm, historical temples and prewar shops. During World War II, Sentul was one of the last towns in Kuala Lumpur that was heavily bombed by the British B-29 planes without any warning on 19 February 1945. The bomb targets were two rail complexes managed by Marai Tetsudo, the Japanese name for the former Federated Malay States Railway (FMSR). The destruction of the central workshop signified the end of the Japanese Occupation in Malaya.

Most of the early residents in Sentul were Indians working in the train depot and central workshop built by the British, dating back to 1896.

Education

Primary schools  

Sekolah Kebangsaan Bandar Baru Sentul
Sekolah Kebangsaan Convent Sentul 1
Sekolah Kebangsaan Convent Sentul 2
Sekolah Kebangsaan La Salle (1) Sentul
Sekolah Kebangsaan Sentul 1
Sekolah Kebangsaan Sentul 2
Sekolah Kebangsaan Sentul Utama
Sekolah Kebangsaan Seri Perak
Sekolah Kebangsaan (L) Methodist Sentul (Methodist Boys Primary School, Sentul)
SJK (C) Chi Man
SJK (C) Sentul
SJK (C) Sentul Pasar
SJK (T) Sentul
SJK (T) St Joseph
SJK (T) Thamboosamy Pillai

Secondary schools 

Sekolah Menengah Kebangsaan Bandar Baru Sentul
Sekolah Menengah Kebangsaan Convent Sentul
Sekolah Menengah Kebangsaan Maxwell
Sekolah Menengah Kebangsaan La Salle Sentul
Sekolah Menengah Kebangsaan Sentul Utama
Sekolah Menengah Kebangsaan (L) Methodist Sentul (Methodist Boys Secondary School, Sentul)

Place of Worship 
 Athi Eswaran Temple Sentul
 Sri Jayanti Buddhist Temple Sentul
 St. Joseph Catholic Church

Accessibility
Sentul is easily accessible via the Kuala Lumpur Middle Ring Road 2 (MRR2), Duta-Ulu Kelang Expressway (DUKE), Sultan Iskandar Highway, Jalan Duta-Segambut Highway, and Sentul Link, as well as through arterial roads such as Jalan Tun Razak, Jalan Ipoh, Jalan Pahang, Jalan Kuching, and Jalan Kepong. 

Sentul is serviced by two light rapid transit (LRT) stations,  Sentul and  Sentul Timur on the  Ampang and Sri Petaling Lines; and a commuter rail station,  Sentul on KTM Komuter  Seremban Line. Sentul is also serviced by a mass rapid transit (MRT) station,  Sentul Barat, on the  Putrajaya Line since 2023.

References

Suburbs in Kuala Lumpur